Hu Changsheng (born December 1963) is a Chinese politician currently serving as Communist Party Secretary of Gansu. He joined the Chinese Communist Party (CCP) in January 1986, and entered the workforce in July of that same year. He is an alternate member of the 19th CCP Central Committee. 

He was a delegate to the 18th National Congress of the Chinese Communist Party and is a delegate to the 19th National Congress of the Chinese Communist Party. He was a delegate to the 11th National People's Congress and is a delegate to the 13th National People's Congress.

Early life and education
Hu was born in Gao'an, Jiangxi, in December 1963. In September 1982, he was admitted to Chengdu Institute of Geology (now Chengdu University of Technology), where he majored in geological and mineral survey. After graduation, he taught at the university. He earned his doctorate in history from Shandong University in December 2003.

Political career
He began his political career in December 1998, when he was appointed deputy magistrate of Jinjiang District, one of eleven urban districts of the prefecture-level city of Chengdu, the capital of Sichuan. He was party chief of Yingjing County in January 2012, but having held the position for only two years. In February 2004, he was appointed head of the Organization Department of Ya'an Municipal Committee of the Chinese Communist Party and was admitted to member of the standing committee of the CCP Ya'an Municipal Committee, the city's top authority. He also served as party chief of Hanyuan County. In October 2006, he was appointed deputy party chief of Suining, concurrently holding the mayor position next month. In February 2012, he became deputy party chief of Garzê Tibetan Autonomous Prefecture, rising to party chief two months later.

In June 2015, he was transferred to the neighboring Qinghai province. He was appointed head of the Organization Department of Qinghai Provincial Committee of the Chinese Communist Party, and promoted to member of the standing committee of the CCP Qinghai Provincial Committee, the province's top authority.

In July 2017, he was assigned to the similar position in the coastal province Fujian. In February 2019, he became party chief of Xiamen, a major tourist city in Fujian province. In September 2020, he was promoted to become deputy party chief of Fujian.

In January 2021, he was transferred to northeast China's Heilongjiang province and appointed deputy party chief and party branch secretary of the provincial government. On 22 February, he was elected governor of Heilongjiang on the 5th session of the 13th Heilongjiang People's Congress.

In December 2022, he was appointed Communist Party Secretary of Gansu, replacing Yin Hong.

References 

1963 births
Living people
People from Gao'an
Chengdu University of Technology alumni
Shandong University alumni
Mayors of Suining
People's Republic of China politicians from Jiangxi
Chinese Communist Party politicians from Jiangxi
Governors of Heilongjiang
Delegates to the 11th National People's Congress
Delegates to the 13th National People's Congress
Members of the 20th Central Committee of the Chinese Communist Party